Ken Bruneflod (born 16 January 1947) is a Swedish curler.

He is a 1979 Swedish men's curling champion.

Teams

Personal life
His father was Swedish curler Karl-Erik Bruneflod.

References

External links
 

Living people
1947 births
Swedish male curlers
Swedish curling champions